MasterChef: A Revanche (English: MasterChef: The Rematch) is a Brazilian cooking competition television series featuring twenty returning contestants from the first six seasons of MasterChef, for another chance to win. The series premiered on Tuesday, October 15, 2019 at 10:45 p.m. (BRT / AMT) on Band.

Format 
Former contestants from the first six seasons of MasterChef, who didn't win their respective seasons, returning for another chance to win the competition. The grand prize was R$250.000, a scholarship on Le Cordon Bleu in Rio de Janeiro, a year's supply on Carrefour worth R$1.000 per month, a complete kitchen of the new Brastemp Gourmand line, a Tramontina kit of pots, knives, barbecue and small home appliances by Breville and the MasterChef: A Revanche trophy.

Contestants

Top 20

Top 10

Elimination table

Key

Ratings and reception

Brazilian ratings
All numbers are in points and provided by Kantar Ibope Media.

References

External links
 MasterChef: A Revanche on Band.com

2019 Brazilian television seasons
2019 Brazilian television series debuts
MasterChef (Brazilian TV series)
Reality television spin-offs
Brazilian television series based on British television series
Brazilian reality television series
Brazilian cooking television series
Rede Bandeirantes original programming